Robert Fellowes, LL.D. (1771 – 6 February 1847) was an English clergyman, journalist and philanthropist.

Life
His father was the eldest son of William Fellowes of Shottesham Hall, Norfolk. After attending Felsted School in Essex Fellowes was educated for the church at St Mary Hall, Oxford, where he graduated with a BA on 30 June 1796, and an MA on 28 January 1801. He took orders, but seems to have held no preferment. For over six years (1804–11) he edited The Critical Review. He was a close friend of Samuel Parr, who introduced him to the embattled Queen Caroline of Brunswick, whose cause he supported. He is said to have written all her replies to the numerous addresses presented to her in 1820.

Francis Maseres left Fellowes at his death in 1824 nearly £200,000. Fellowes erected to the memory of Maseres a monument in Reigate churchyard, with a eulogistic inscription in Latin. He used this fortune in aiding private distress and in forwarding benevolent schemes. In 1826 he gave benefactions to encourage the study of natural philosophy at the University of Edinburgh. He was one of the promoters of London University. Out of gratitude for the professional services of Dr John Elliotson, who held a chair of medicine at University College London he provided there two annual gold medals, the Fellowes Medals, for proficiency in clinical medicine.

Fellowes interested himself in the opening of Regent's Park to the public, and in the emancipation of the Jews. He was an advanced liberal in politics, but drew the line at universal suffrage. In 1828 he purchased The Examiner and made Albany Fonblanque editor. He lectured at the opening of the chapel of the Beaumont Philosophical Institution.

Fellowes died in Dorset Square on 6 February 1847, leaving a young family. He was buried at Kensal Green on 13 February.  His son, Robert Fellowes of Shotesham Hall was High Sheriff of Norfolk in 1874.

Works
A list of Fellowes's publications is given in the Gentleman's Magazine. They include:

 A Picture of Christian Philosophy, or … Illustration of the Character of Jesus, 1798; 2nd ed. 1799; 3rd ed. 1800; 4th ed. with supplement, 1803. 
 An Address to the People, &c., 1799.
 Morality united with Policy, &c., 1800.
 The Rights of Property Vindicated, &c., 1818.
 Poems, … Original and Translated, &c., 1806 (many of the translations are from Gesner).

His religious publications advocated practical philanthropy. By degrees he abandoned the distinctive Anglican tenets, and in his work The Religion of the Universe, he aimed to divest religion of most of its supernatural elements. Major writings were:

 The Anti-Calvinist, Warwick, 1800; 2nd ed. London, 1801.
 Religion without Cant, &c., 1801.
 The Guide to Immortality, &c., 1804, 3 vols. (a digest of the four gospels).
 A Body of Theology, &c., 1807.
 The Religion of the Universe, &c., 1836; 3rd ed. Lond. and Edinb. 1864, (with additions from his manuscripts). 
 A Lecture delivered on Opening the Chapel … in Beaumont Square, 1841.
 Common-sense Truths, &c., 1844.

Fellowes translated from the Latin John Milton's Familiar Epistles and Second Defence of the People of England for an 1806 edition. Some of his publications were issued under the pseudonym Philalethes A.M. Oxon.

References

Attribution

1771 births
1847 deaths
People from Shotesham
English philanthropists
Alumni of St Mary Hall, Oxford
19th-century English writers
English editors
19th-century English Anglican priests
Burials at Kensal Green Cemetery